Rade Radivojević (1874—July 1907), known as Vojvoda Dušan (Душан), was a Serbian Chetnik vojvoda in Old Serbia and Macedonia during the Macedonian Struggle.

Life
Radivojević was born in 1874 in Vasojevići, Principality of Montenegro (now Montenegro). He finished the Serbian theological school in Prizren, and started teaching in the Oreše village near Veles.

Upon Jovan Babunski's joining of the Serbian Chetnik Organization, also Radivojević joined with his armed band into the vicinity of Veles. In 1905 and 1906 he participated in all action around Kičevo, Prilep and Veles, together with the voivodes Gligor Sokolović, Stefan Nedić, Vasilije Trbić, Trenko Rujanović, Jovan Dolgač, Mihailo Josifović and Mihailo Jovanović. Because of hectic guerilla warfare and exhaustion, Radivojević and his band were returned to Serbia in late 1906, where they vacated until spring 1907.

At this time, the Internal Macedonian Revolutionary Organization (IMRO) decided on a major offensive against the Serbian bands on the right side of the Vardar. An IMRO unit of 130 fighters under the command of several Bulgarian officers set off against Poreče and Azot to destroy Serbian bands and villages. The local Serbian bands were weakened and diminished by the constant warfare, thus, in March 1907 when the Ottoman troops proved strong in the Kumanovo region, Radivojević and his band were sent across Kosovo as aid, and were all wearing Albanian clothes with the plan to reach Poreče disguised as Albanian kachaks. However, they were discovered near the village of Pasjane in the Gnjilane region on 14 July 1907, in the local church. An Ottoman army and Albanian bashi-bazouk numbering 2,000 surrounded the church. The band was almost completely destroyed, with the exception of three Chetniks who were caught a few days after the battle, and then sentenced to death by hanging. Rade Radivojević and lieutenant Dragoljub Nikolić were killed in action.

See also
 List of Chetnik voivodes

References

Sources

scindeks-clanci.ceon.rs

1874 births
1907 deaths
20th-century Serbian people
Serbian rebels
Serbian educators
Serbian military leaders
Serbs of Montenegro
People of the Principality of Montenegro